Vermo is the main harness racing track of Finland, opened in 1977. It is located in the Leppävaara district of Espoo, but is officially regarded as the racecourse of the neighbouring Helsinki. Length of the track is 1000 metres and width 24–26 metres. Notable race is Finlandia-Ajo.

External links
 The official homepage of Vermo 

Buildings and structures in Espoo
Leppävaara
Harness racing in Finland
Horse racing venues in Finland
Sports venues in Helsinki